Banana chips (sometimes called banana crisps) are deep-fried or dried, generally crispy slices of bananas. They are usually made from firmer, starchier banana varieties ("cooking bananas" or plantains) like the Saba and Nendran cultivars. They can be sweet or savory, and can be covered with sugar, honey, salt, or various spices.

Banana chips are the only processed banana product with significant international trade. The main exporter of banana chips worldwide is the Philippines. Export markets for banana chips are also established in Thailand and Indonesia.

Fried
Fried banana chips are usually produced from under-ripe banana slices deep-fried in sunflower oil or coconut oil. These chips are dry (like potato chips), contain about 4% water (table), and can be salted, spiced, sugar coated or jaggery coated. Sometimes banana flavoring is added. If ripe dessert bananas are used, they come out soggy. They are used for desserts, not for dry chips.

Dried
Some varieties of banana chips can be produced using only food dehydration. Banana slices that are only dehydrated are not dark yellow and crunchy, but rather are brown, leathery and chewy. They are very sweet and have an intense banana flavor. These are ideally made from bananas that are fully ripe. Another kind is made by baking in an oven, although this process may not result in the same intense banana flavor.

Nutrition
Dried banana chips are 4% water, 58% carbohydrates, 34% fat, and 2% protein. In a 100 gram reference amount, dried banana chips supply 520 calories and are a rich source (20% or more the Daily Value, DV) of magnesium (21% DV) and vitamin B6 (20% DV), with moderate amounts of iron, copper, and potassium (10% to 11% DV) (table). Other micronutrients are in negligible amounts of the Daily Value (see nutrition table).

Uses and variations

Philippines
The Philippines is, by far, the main exporter of banana chips worldwide. It exports large quantities to more than 30 countries, including the United States, Canada, the European Union, Japan, Australia, South Korea, China, and Russia. The annual revenue for banana chip exports of the Philippines was approximately $35 million in 2009. There are many variants of banana chips in the Philippines, from traditional dishes like pinasugbo to modern versions coated in cheese powder. Banana chips in the Philippines are made predominantly from saba or cardava bananas, with the latter preferred for commercial banana chips due to their larger sizes. For domestic production and home cooking, they are made directly by deep-frying fresh sliced bananas. The resulting chips are distinctively light-colored.

India
Both ripe and unripe plantains are used for this type of chip preparation. The chips may be coated with masala or jaggery to form spicy and sweet variations. It is an integral part of the traditional Kerala meal called  served during weddings and festivals, such as Onam.

Indonesia

Banana is a native plant of Maritime Southeast Asia and the people of the archipelago has developed many uses of it for ages, including as a snack. In Indonesia, banana chip is called kripik pisang, and is considered as a variant of crispy kripik (traditional chip or crisp). Kripik pisang is a popular crispy snack and can be commonly found in Indonesia, although it seems to be more prevalent in Java and Sumatra. In North Maluku, popular with pisang mulu bebek is a duck mouth shaped banana chips. It is served with sambal, fried peanut, and fried anchovy. In Lampung, banana chips is combined with chocolate powder called kripik pisang coklat.

Usually unripe green bananas are thinly sliced, soaked in lime and salt water solution, and being deep fried as chips. Unripe banana is well suited for deep frying due to its low content of water and sugar, while having high starch content. Pisang goreng is another fried banana snack, although it is not thinly sliced and serves as a sweet hot snack.

Americas

The chips are often part of muesli and nut mixes. Other chips, such as patacones, are salty.
Similar chips called chifle are made from plantains, the family of fruit that bananas come from. In tropical American cultures, all bananas are considered plantains, but not all plantains are bananas. These deep-fried plantain chips are also quite popular in the southeastern part of Mexico, especially in the state of Tabasco.

Gallery

See also

 Apple chip
 Banana - In popular culture and commerce, "banana" usually refers to soft, sweet "dessert" Musa cultivars.
 Banana powder
 Chifle - a similar salty snack chip made from plantains.
 Plantain - Musa cultivars with firmer, starchier fruit
 Tostones - a similar salty snack made from plantains.
 Kripik - Indonesian chips, kripik pisang is Indonesian banana chips
 List of deep fried foods
 List of dried foods

References

Snack foods
Dried fruit
Banana dishes
Deep fried foods
Indian snack foods
Indonesian snack foods
Philippine desserts
Kerala cuisine